Coleophora ardesicola is a moth of the family Coleophoridae that is endemic to Turkey.

References

External links

ardesicola
Endemic fauna of Turkey
Moths of Asia
Moths described in 2002